Hartog "Han" Hollander (5 October 1886 – 9 July 1943) was the first Dutch radio sports journalist. He was of Jewish origin.

External links

Han Hollander on the Digital Monument of the Jewish Community in the Netherlands
Hartog Hollander in the database of the Institute of Dutch History

Sportspeople from Deventer
1886 births
1943 deaths
Dutch radio presenters
Dutch radio journalists
Dutch sports journalists
Dutch Jews who died in the Holocaust
Dutch people who died in Sobibor extermination camp
Dutch civilians killed in World War II